Florida Municipal Museum is a museum located in Florida, Cuba. It was established on 12 December 1981. The museum holds collections on history, weaponry, archeology, numismatics, and natural science.

See also 
 List of museums in Cuba

References 

Museums in Cuba
Museum
Buildings and structures in Camagüey Province
Museums established in 1981
1981 establishments in Cuba
20th-century architecture in Cuba